Sir Edward Ebenezer Parkes (1848 – 29 June 1919) was an English Liberal Unionist politician who served as Member of Parliament (MP) for Birmingham Central.

When the Liberal Unionist John Albert Bright stood down at the 1895 general election, Parkes was elected in his place to the House of Commons. He held the seat until the constituency was abolished for the 1918 general election, sitting as a Conservative after the Conservatives and Liberal Unionists merged in 1912.

After Birmingham Central's abolition, he did not seek re-election again .

References

External links 
 

1848 births
1919 deaths
Knights Bachelor
Liberal Unionist Party MPs for English constituencies
Conservative Party (UK) MPs for English constituencies
Politicians awarded knighthoods
UK MPs 1895–1900
UK MPs 1900–1906
UK MPs 1906–1910
UK MPs 1910
UK MPs 1910–1918